M. Kerswill (born April 5, 1973 in Wilmington, Delaware) is an American musician best known for his drumming in the bands Unearth, Seemless, Kingdom of Sorrow, and multiple fill-ins/studio projects. He was also invited to play in the heavy metal band The Sword around 2011 but turned down the offer and decided to work at the Bose Corporation instead. He then started private drum lessons after a little while with the company.Most recently however Derek has taken on many jobs like a truck driver and a septic tank pumper.

Biography
Derek has been playing drums since the age of 9.  He is completely self-taught and also writes music on guitar and bass for his band Seemless.

His resume boasts some of metals top visionaries, including most recently, Massachusetts based metal outfit Unearth and underground sludge-core super group Kingdom of Sorrow.  Kingdom of Sorrow's debut album was released in February 2008, debuting at #131 on Billboard Top 200.  He has also spent time in Shadows Fall, Icepick, and a host of studio work that has demonstrated his diverse playing, while always maintaining a style all his own. He has also coined the term "Brutal Groove", which best describes his style.  He was also officially named as Unearth's new drummer. Most recently, his project Seemless has disbanded, but the surprisingly atmospheric and pop-sensible T A N G E N T S has surfaced as his new project, with longtime friend and song writing collaborator Dave Witham.

In late 2010, Derek announced his departure from Unearth and immediately toured with The Ghost Inside on their "Returners" 25 date European tour. Another new project with Matt Bachand and Jon Donais of Shadows Fall fame has surfaced in the form of a heavy and 80's influenced rock/metal band called Dead of Night.

In late 2014, a new supergroup featuring Derek & Brian Fair of Shadows Fall surfaced in the form of Downpour and rumors have been flying through the metal industry for months claiming they have an entire record finished and they are just waiting for the "right label" before releasing.

According to his Myspace page www.myspace.com/derekkerswill
Also found at www.purevolume.com/derekkerswill

Equipment
Derek Kerswill uses USA Custom, New Classic, and Renown Maple Gretsch drums, a variety of snare drums, and Gibraltar Hardware. He also uses and endorses Aquarian drumheads, Vater drumsticks (he uses X-Treme Designs "Punisher" and "Warrior"), XL Specialty Cases and Meinl cymbals.

Current tour kit (2008-2009) 
Gretsch Drums & Meinl Cymbals:
Drums - New Classic Maple in Deep Cherry Gloss
10x8" Tom
12x9" Tom
13x10" Tom
14x14" Floor Tom
16x16" Floor Tom
22x18" Bass Drum
14x6.5" Gretsch Banged Brass Snare
Cymbals – Meinl
14" Mb20 Heavy Soundwave Hi-Hats
22" Mb20 Heavy Ride
18" Byzance Traditional Medium Crash
19" Mb20 Heavy Crash
20" Mb20 Heavy Crash
20" Byzance Traditional China

Discography
Downpour - “s/t” (2018)
The V - "Now or Never" (2015)
Christa Alberts - "My Song" (2011)
T A N G E N T S - "One Little Light Year" (2010)
Sonia V. - "Oh Sweet Tragedy - anthems from the ashes" (2009)
Unearth - "The March" (2008)
Kingdom of Sorrow - "Kingdom of Sorrow" (2008)
Garuda - "Garuda" (2008)
Unearth - "Alive From The Apocalypse" DVD (2008)
Shadows Fall - Seeking The Way: The Greatest Hits
Seemless - "What Have We Become" (2006)
Icepick - "Violent Epiphany" (2006)
Seemless - "Seemless" (2005)
Stryper - "Reborn" (2005)
Robby Roadsteamer - "Okay Computer" (2004)
New Idea Society - "You Are Awake Or Asleep" (2004)
Twelfth Of Never - "Things That Were" (2003)
Shadows Fall - "Fear Will Drag You Down" European & Australian release
Medium - "Terra Firma" (2002)
The Rise Park - "The Rise Park" (2001)
Long Distance Runner - "s/t" (1999)
Scattered Remnants - "Destined To Fail" (1997)

Guest appearances
Unearth - "Live From The Apocalypse" DVD (2008)

References

Unearth - Alive from the Apocalypse DVD (2006). Kerswill is featured and provides live drums.
Derek Kerswill Meinl Cymbals Page | Brutal Groove Last updated April 30, 2008
Derek Kerswill MySpace | Brutal Groove Last updated May 10, 2008
Derek Kerswill Pure Volume - Lunenburg, MA - Music Information on Derek.
Garuda Myspace

1973 births
People from Lunenburg, Massachusetts
People from Wilmington, Delaware
Living people
American heavy metal drummers
Musicians from Massachusetts